José Rafael de Pombo y Rebolledo (November 7, 1833 – May 5, 1912) was a Colombian poet born in Bogotá. Trained as a mathematician and an engineer in a military school, Rafael Pombo served in the army and he traveled to the United States of America as Secretary of the Legation in Washington. After completing his diplomatic assignment, he was hired by D. Appleton & Company in New York to translate into Spanish nursery rhymes from the Anglo-Saxon oral tradition. The product of this work, more than a translation, was a transformative adaptation published in two books under the titles Cuentos pintados para niños and Cuentos morales para niños formales.

In spite of his extensive and diverse literary works, Rafael Pombo is mostly remembered for this contribution to children's literature. Among his most popular children's fables are Michín, Juan Chunguero, 
Pastorcita, La Pobre Viejecita, Simón el Bobito, El Gato Bandido, and El Renacuajo paseador.

After seventeen years in the United States of America, Rafael Pombo returned to Colombia, where he worked as a celebrated translator and journalist (founding several newspapers). On August 20, 1905 he was crowned as Colombia's best poet - his Poesías Completas was published in 1957, from which the poem En El Niágara was taken. Rafael Pombo remained in Colombia until his death on May 5, 1912.

References
WikiSource has the original works of Rafael Pombo  
 Entry in the Online Library of Colombia's Central Bank (Biblioteca Luis Angel Arango)
 Shorter entry in the Online Library of Colombia's Central Bank (Biblioteca Luis Angel Arango)
 Short Biography in the official website of the Presidency of Colombia
 Entry in the Online Library of the Andes

Del Rosario University alumni
Colombian diplomats
19th-century Colombian poets
20th-century Colombian poets
Colombian male poets
1833 births
1912 deaths
Burials at Central Cemetery of Bogotá
20th-century male writers